Papageno Airport,  was an airstrip  west of Calafquén Lake.

Google Earth Historical Imagery (8/28/2010) shows the unmarked runway. The (12/27/2013) image shows the runway area planted and a new drainage ditch crossing its southern portion. Current imagery (10/20/2016) has crops planted on the area.

See also

Transport in Chile
List of airports in Chile

References

External links 
OpenStreetMap - Papageno Airport

Defunct airports
Airports in Chile
Airports in Los Ríos Region